Clara Vulpisi (born July 15, 1998 in Craiova, Romania) is a Canadian water polo player from Montreal.   She is a member of the Canada women's national water polo team. She will participate in the 2020 Summer Olympics.

Career
She participated at the 2017 FINA Women's Water Polo World League, 2018 FINA Women's Water Polo World League, and 2017 Universiade. 

She played for Mariano Marcos State University, and University of the Pacific. 

In June 2021, Vulpisi was named to Canada's 2020 Summer Olympics team as an alternate.

References 

1998 births
Living people
Water polo players from Montreal
Sportspeople from Craiova
Canadian female water polo players
Water polo goalkeepers
Romanian emigrants to Canada
Water polo players at the 2020 Summer Olympics
Olympic water polo players of Canada